Hacks may refer to:

Arts, entertainment, and media
 Hacks (1997 film), a 1997 American comedy film
 Hacks (2002 film), a 2002 independent American film
 Hacks: The Inside Story, a book by Donna Brazile
 Hacks (TV series), a 2021 American comedy-drama television series

Other uses
 Hackney carriages, also called hacks, taxicabs in the city of London
 Hacks at the Massachusetts Institute of Technology, student pranks at the institute
 Peter Hacks (1928–2003), German playwright, author, and essayist

See also
 Hack (disambiguation)
 Hacker (disambiguation)
 Hacking (disambiguation)
 Hács, a village in Somogy county, Hungary